Sirajganj-5 is a constituency represented in the Jatiya Sangsad (National Parliament) of Bangladesh since 2019 by Abdul Momin Mondol of the Awami League.

Boundaries 
The constituency encompasses Belkuchi and Chauhali upazilas.

History 
The constituency was created in 1984 from the Pabna-5 constituency when the former Pabna District was split into two districts: Sirajganj and Pabna.

Ahead of the 2008 general election, the Election Commission redrew constituency boundaries to reflect population changes revealed by the 2001 Bangladesh census. The 2008 redistricting altered the boundaries of the constituency.

Members of Parliament

Elections

Elections in the 2010s

Elections in the 2000s

Elections in the 1990s

References

External links
 

Parliamentary constituencies in Bangladesh
Sirajganj District